The 1993–94 International Hockey League season was the second season of the International Hockey League, the top level of ice hockey in Russia. 24 teams participated in the league, and HK Lada Togliatti became the first ever team from outside the capital to win the championship by defeating HK Dynamo Moscow in the final.

Regular season

Playoffs

External links
Season on hockeyarchives.ru

1993–94 in Russian ice hockey leagues
International Hockey League (1992–1996) seasons